Alberto Dines (February 19, 1932 – May 22, 2018) was a Brazilian journalist and writer.

Biography
With a career spanning over five decades, Dines directed and launched several magazines and newspapers in Brazil and Portugal. He has taught journalism since 1963, and was a visiting professor at the Columbia University School of Journalism in 1974.

Dines was the editor in chief of Jornal do Brasil for twelve years, in addition to coordinating the Rio de Janeiro branch of Folha de S.Paulo. He was also the director of Grupo Abril in Portugal, where he launched the Exame magazine.

After years of dodging the military dictatorship censorship as the editor in chief of Jornal do Brazil, Dines was fired in June 1974 for publishing an article criticizing the overtly amicable relationship between the owners of the newspaper and the state government of Rio de Janeiro.

In addition to working as a journalist, Dines has written over 15 books, including Death in Paradise, the Tragedy of Stefan Zweig (1981) and Fire Links – Antônio José da Silva, the Jew and other stories of the Inquisition in Portugal and Brazil (1992). His book about Stefan Zweig was adapted into the film Lost Zweig (2002), directed by Sylvio Back. Dines also discussed Zweig in a documentary by the same director.

In April 1996, Dines launched the groundbreaking Observatório da Imprensa website. The media analysis website was later adapted into a weekly TV show, currently aired by TV Brasil, and a daily radio show, aired on public stations.

Awards
 1970: Maria Moors Cabot Prize
 2005: Prêmio Imprensa Estrangeira
 October 2007: Austrian Holocaust Memorial Award
 2009: Austrian Cross of Honour for Science and Art
 March 29, 2010: Roberto Marinho Prize for Communication (Brazil)

Works
Morte no paraíso, a tragédia de Stefan Zweig, Editora Nova Fronteira (1981), Editora Rocco (2004)
Tod im Paradies. Die Tragödie des Stefan Zweig, Edition Büchergilde (2006)

References

External links
Observatório da Imprensa, the website 
Observatório da Imprensa, the TV show 

1932 births
2018 deaths
Brazilian Jews
Brazilian journalists
Male journalists
Brazilian magazine editors
Jewish Brazilian writers
Maria Moors Cabot Prize winners
Recipients of the Austrian Cross of Honour for Science and Art
Stefan Zweig
People from Rio de Janeiro (city)